Furatena Airport  is an airport serving the emerald region of the western emerald belt and town of Quípama in the Boyacá Department of Colombia. The airport is four nautical miles west of Muzo Airport.

The runway sits on a narrow shelf next to the town, with dropoffs on both ends and the west side. Mountainous terrain exists in all quadrants.

Etymology 

The airport is named after Furatena, a cacica of the Muzo and the double mountain peak close to the airport, Fura and Tena. The mountains, separated by the Minero River and located in the San Pablo de Borbur and Pauna respectively, were considered sacred by the Muzo. According to the Muzo legends, the tears of Fura turned into emeralds and butterflies. The Muisca performed secret pilgrimages to Fura and Tena, avoiding the Muzo warriors to discover them. In his work Compendio historial de la conquista del Nuevo Reino de Granada, Lucas Fernández de Piedrahita tells about the existence of a cacica named Furatena. Furatena was the owner of the finest emeralds of the Muzo territories and in the early years of the Spanish conquest, zipa Sagipa wanted to see Furatena.

See also 
 Transport in Colombia
 List of airports in Colombia

References

Bibliography

External links 
 OpenStreetMap - Quípama
 Colombian emerald mining
 Colombian emerald mining

Airports in Colombia
Buildings and structures in Boyacá Department
Colombian emeralds